London Welsh Amateur Rugby Football Club, previously known as London Welsh Druids and as of 2017 London Welsh, is an English amateur rugby union club based at Old Deer Park in Richmond, London. They were the amateur team of London Welsh until the professional team's liquidation in 2017. The amateur team continued independently as they were considered a separate club by the Rugby Football Union. For season 2021–22 they played in London 1 South - a league at tier 6 of the English rugby union system - following the club's promotion as champions of London 2 North West at the end of the 2019–20 season. Following completion of 'Project Reset' with 4 promotions in 4 seasons after the professional sides' liquidation, LWRFC will play in the 5th Tier Regional 1 South Central league for 2022-23 season

History 
London Welsh Amateur were founded in the 1990s after London Welsh reached the top of National League 1 and decided to split the club to separate the professional wing from the community club. In 2004, London Welsh Amateur were incorporated as a limited company. In 2017, London Welsh were expelled from the RFU Championship and later liquidated due to debt. When London Welsh were given extra time for a phoenix company to take over the club and fulfill RFU regulations, one of the conditions was that they had to show a clear separation between London Welsh and London Welsh Amateur but were unable to meet the requirements. Despite this decision, it did not affect London Welsh Amateur as they were held as having a separate membership of the RFU and separate voting rights.

As a result, London Welsh Amateur became the primary representatives of the London Welsh club. They also stated that they would remain amateur despite inheriting the liquidated professional club's infrastructure. For their first season since London Welsh's liquidation, London Welsh Amateur appointed former Welsh international Sonny Parker as director of rugby.  Following the professional side's liquidation, London Welsh Amateur adopted the London Welsh name.

At the end of the 2017–18 season they finished as champions of Herts/Middlesex 1 and gained promotion to London 3 North West.

After the 2019-20 season was abandoned due to the coronavirus outbreak, London Welsh finished as Champions of London 2 North West and were promoted to London 1 South for 2020-21 season, which was not played due to the ongoing Covid-19 pandemic.

Honours
Herts/Middlesex 1 champions: 2017–18
London 3 North West champions: 2018–19
London 2 North West champions: 2019–20
London 1 South runners-up (promoted): 2021-22

See also
 London Scottish
 London Irish
 Rugby union in London

References 

Rugby union clubs in London
London Welsh RFC
Welsh diaspora
Diaspora sports clubs in the United Kingdom